The highest-selling albums and mini-albums in Japan are ranked in the Oricon Weekly Chart, published by Oricon Style magazine. The data is compiled by Oricon based on each album's weekly physical sales. In 2013, a total of 46 albums occupied the peak position on the chart. Arashi's Love was the best-selling album of 2013.

Chart history

See also
2013 in music

References

Number-one albums
Japan
2013

de:Liste der Nummer-eins-Hits in Japan (2013)